Paolino Bertaccini (born 19 November 1997) is a Belgian footballer who plays for Austrian club Wacker Innsbruck. He plays as a winger.

Career 

Born in Charleroi, Bertaccini played with Charleroi, Standard Liège, Club Brugge and Genk as a junior. He made his Belgian Pro League debut with K.R.C. Genk on 18 January 2015 against Lokeren.

References

External links
 
 

1997 births
Sportspeople from Charleroi
Footballers from Hainaut (province)
Living people
Belgian footballers
Association football wingers
Belgium youth international footballers
K.R.C. Genk players
Cercle Brugge K.S.V. players
F.C. Arouca players
K.M.S.K. Deinze players
FC Wacker Innsbruck (2002) players
Belgian Pro League players
Challenger Pro League players
Liga Portugal 2 players
Austrian Regionalliga players
2. Liga (Austria) players
Belgian expatriate footballers
Belgian expatriate sportspeople in Portugal
Expatriate footballers in Portugal
Belgian expatriate sportspeople in Austria
Expatriate footballers in Austria